
 

Goolwa South (previously known as South Goolwa) is a locality in the Australian state of  South Australia located about  south of the state capital of Adelaide on both on the southern continental coastline and the south-western coast of Lake Alexandrina.  It occupies the full extent of the Sir Richard Peninsula, land to the immediate west and part of the Goolwa Channel in the lake system to its north.

The name was first used in respect to a private sub-division of land within the cadastral unit of the Hundred of Goolwa in 1925.  Boundaries were created for the “long established name” in 1993 and were again adjusted in August 2000 to include the Sir Richard Peninsula in the adjoining Hundred of Nangkita.

The western end of the locality is occupied by an urban area which extends into the adjoining localities of Goolwa and Goolwa Beach while the remainder of the locality is zoned for conservation and includes part of the Coorong National Park.

Goolwa South is located within the federal division of Mayo, the state electoral district of Finniss and the local government area of the Alexandrina Council.

See also
Goolwa Barrages

References

Towns in South Australia